Dreamlovers is a Belgian pop group.

Discography
Nothing's Gonna Change My Love For You (CD, Single)   Arcade Music Company (Belgium) 1999 
15 Hits (CD)   CNR Music 2000  #5 in the Ultratop
Always Be With You (CD, Single), Arcade Music Company (Belgium), 2000 
 Someone Loves You Honey & The Way You Are (CD, Single), CNR Music, 2000 
 18 Hits (CD), Mouse Music Company, 2001, #1 in the Ultratop 
 I Just Can't Help Believin' (CD, Single), Mouse Music Company, 2001 
 Love Story (CD, Single), Mouse Music Company, 2001 
 18 Hits III (CD, Album), Mouse Music Company, 2002, #1 in the Ultratop 
 I Can See Clearly Now (CD, Single), Mouse Music Company, 2002 
 Stop! (CD, Single), Mouse Music Company, 2002 
 20 Hits 4 (CD, Album), #1 in the Ultratop 
20 Best Slows (CD), Universal Music (Belgium), 2004

References

Belgian pop music groups